Charles Pinkney "Chick" Halbert IV (February 27, 1919 –  March 4, 2013) was an American professional basketball player.

A 6'9" center from West Texas A&M University, Halbert played five seasons (1946–1951) in the Basketball Association of America (later known as the National Basketball Association).  He was a member of the Chicago Stags, the Philadelphia Warriors, the Boston Celtics, the Providence Steamrollers, the Washington Capitols, and the Baltimore Bullets. He averaged 8.8 points per game and 7.9 rebounds per game in his career and earned All-BAA Second Team honors in 1947.

BAA/NBA career statistics

Regular season

Playoffs

References

External links

Death Notice

1919 births
2013 deaths
All-American college men's basketball players
American men's basketball players
Baltimore Bullets (1944–1954) players
Basketball players from Texas
Boston Celtics players
Centers (basketball)
Chicago Stags players
People from Albany, Texas
Philadelphia Warriors players
Providence Steamrollers players
Washington Capitols players
West Texas A&M Buffaloes basketball players